Interventionism refers to a political practice of intervention, particularly to the practice of governments to interfere in political affairs of other countries, staging military or trade interventions. Economic interventionism refers to a different practice of intervention, one of economic policy at home.

Military intervention as the main issue, has been defined in the context of international relations as "the deployment of military personnel across recognized boundaries for the purpose of deter­mining the political authority structure in the target state." Interventions may just be focused on altering political authority structures, but also be conducted for humanitarian purposes, as well as debt collection.

Interventionism has played a major role in the foreign policies of Western powers, particularly during and after the Victorian era. The New Imperialism era saw numerous interventions by Western nations in the Global South, including the Banana Wars. Modern interventionism grew out of Cold War policies, where the United States and the Soviet Union intervened in nations around the world to counter any influence held there by the other nation. Historians have noted that interventionism has always been a contentious political issue among public opinion of countries which engaged in interventions.

According to a dataset by Alexander Downes, 120 leaders were removed through foreign-imposed regime change between 1816 and 2011. A 2016 study by Carnegie Mellon University political scientist Dov Haim Levin (who now teaches at the University of Hong Kong) found that the United States intervened in 81 foreign elections between 1946 and 2000, with the majority of those being through covert, rather than overt, actions. Multilateral interventions that include territorial governance by foreign institutions also include cases like East Timor and Kosovo, and have been proposed (but were rejected) for the Palestinian territories. A 2021 review of the existing literature found that foreign interventions since World War II tend overwhelmingly to fail to achieve their purported objectives.

Foreign-imposed regime change 

Studies by Alexander Downes, Lindsey O'Rourke, and Jonathan Monten indicate that foreign-imposed regime change seldom reduces the likelihood of civil war, violent removal of the newly imposed leader, and the probability of conflict between the intervening state and its adversaries, and does not increase the likelihood of democratization unless regime change comes with pro-democratic institutional changes in countries with favorable conditions for democracy. Downes argues:
"The strategic impulse to forcibly oust antagonistic or non-compliant regimes overlooks two key facts. First, the act of overthrowing a foreign government sometimes causes its military to disintegrate, sending thousands of armed men into the countryside where they often wage an insurgency against the intervener. Second, externally-imposed leaders face a domestic audience in addition to an external one, and the two typically want different things. These divergent preferences place imposed leaders in a quandary: taking actions that please one invariably alienates the other. Regime change thus drives a wedge between external patrons and their domestic protégés or between protégés and their people."

Research by Nigel Lo, Barry Hashimoto, and Dan Reiter has contrasting findings, as they find that interstate "peace following wars last longer when the war ends in foreign-imposed regime change." However, research by Reiter and Goran Peic finds that foreign-imposed regime change can raise the probability of civil war.

In Africa 
Among African nations, Nigeria has shown the will to intervene in the affairs of other sub Saharan African countries since independence. It is said that one of the reasons Yakubu Gowon was removed from office had  been the squandering of Nigeria’s resources in such far-away lands as Grenada and Guyana, with no returns, economic or political for Nigeria. The philosophy of subsequent military governments in Nigeria was that in an increasingly interdependent world, a country cannot be an island.

See also 

 Counterinsurgency
 Economic sanctions
 Embargo
 Foreign electoral intervention
 Foreign interventions by China
 Foreign interventions by Cuba
 Foreign interventions by the United States
 Foreign involvement in the Syrian Civil War
 Gun boat diplomacy
 Humanitarian intervention
 International military intervention against ISIL
 International isolation
 International relations theory
 Isolationism
 Liberal internationalism
 Military occupation
 Multilateralism
 Neoconservatism
 Non-interventionism
 Pacification
 Peacekeeping
 Peace enforcement
 Peacemaker
 Peace makers
 Peacemaking
 Police action
 Russian military intervention in Ukraine (2014–present)
 Sakoku
 Unilateralism
 White man's burden

Further reading 
 Kupchan, Charles A. Isolationism: A History of America's Efforts to Shield Itself from the World (Oxford University Press, 2020).

 Lee, Melissa M. 2020. Crippling Leviathan: How Foreign Subversion Weakens the State. Princeton University Press.

References

External links
 Interventionism (Internet Encyclopedia of Philosophy)
 Empirical Knowledge on Foreign Military Intervention (Oxford Encyclopedia of Empirical International Relations Theory)

Foreign intervention
Geopolitics
International relations theory
Political science terminology